Stilesville is a town in Franklin Township, Hendricks County, Indiana, United States. The population was 316 at the 2010 Census.

History
Stilesville was laid out in 1828. It was named for Jeremiah Stiles, a pioneer settler. The National Road was built through Stilesville in 1830.

Geography
Stilesville is located at  (39.639509, -86.632754).

Demographics

2010 census
At the 2010 census there were 316 people, 124 households, and 89 families living in the town. The racial makeup of the town was 98.7% White, 0.3% African American, and 0.9% from other races. Hispanic or Latino of any race were 2.8%.

Of the 124 households 35.5% had children under the age of 18 living with them, 50.8% were married couples living together, 12.1% had a female householder with no husband present, 8.9% had a male householder with no wife present, and 28.2% were non-families. 23.4% of households were one person and 4.8% were one person aged 65 or older. The average household size was 2.55 and the average family size was 3.01.

The median age in the town was 41.9 years. 25.3% of residents were under the age of 18; 8.8% were between the ages of 18 and 24; 21.8% were from 25 to 44; 30.3% were from 45 to 64; and 13.6% were 65 or older. The gender makeup of the town was 49.1% male and 50.9% female.

2000 census
At the 2000 census there were 261 people, 109 households, and 82 families living in the town. The racial makeup of the town was 98.85% White and 1.15% Native American. Hispanic or Latino of any race were 0.77%.

Of the 109 households 30.3% had children under the age of 18 living with them, 60.6% were married couples living together, 13.8% had a female householder with no husband present, and 23.9% were non-families. 21.1% of households were one person and 7.3% were one person aged 65 or older. The average household size was 2.39 and the average family size was 2.80.

The age distribution was 23.0% under the age of 18, 8.0% from 18 to 24, 29.9% from 25 to 44, 23.0% from 45 to 64, and 16.1% 65 or older. The median age was 40 years. For every 100 females, there were 96.2 males. For every 100 females age 18 and over, there were 95.1 males.

The median household income was $37,857 and the median family income  was $48,750. Males had a median income of $34,500 versus $21,563 for females. The per capita income for the town was $20,494. None of the population or families were below the poverty line.

References

External links
 Mill Creek Community Historical Society

Towns in Indiana
Towns in Hendricks County, Indiana
Indianapolis metropolitan area